An exhibition is an organized presentation and display of a selection of items.

Exhibition may also refer to:

Art exhibition, a presentation of art
Solo show (art exhibition), a presentation of art by a single artist
Exhibition (equestrian), a sport involving horses and riders
Exhibition (scholarship), a financial award to scholars
Exhibition game, a friendly match
Exhibition (film), a film directed by Joanna Hogg
Exhibition (album), a Gary Numan compilation album
Exhibition GO Station, a station in the GO Transit network located in western Toronto, Ontario, Canada
Exhibition, Saskatoon, a neighbourhood in Saskatoon, Canada

See also

Exhibition hall, where exhibitions are held
Exhibitioner, a student who has been awarded an exhibition grant
Exhibitionism, public displaying of nudity
Expo (disambiguation)
Fair
Collection (artwork)
Biennale